Biddeford City Theater is a restored Victorian opera house at 205 Main Street in Biddeford, Maine, United States. City Theater produces and hosts theater, dance and music performances year-round and aims to, “foster an appreciation for the performing arts by using creative avenues to increase community involvement.”

City Theater is part of the Biddeford City Hall complex, designed by Maine architect John Calvin Stevens in 1895.  The building is included on the National Register of Historic Places, and is a contributing element to the Biddeford Main Street Historic District.

Theater history
Biddeford's City Theater originally opened as an opera house in October 1860 at its present Main Street location as a part of the Biddeford City Hall complex. The opera house enjoyed a high level of popularity in the Biddeford and Southern Maine region until burning down December 30, 1894. Whether to rebuild the opera house was debated, the city eventually settled on rebuilding a more structurally sound opera house.

Architect John Calvin Stevens was chosen to design the new city hall and opera house, which opened January 20, 1896. The opera house again became a favorite site for cultural and entertainment attractions. Through to the 1920s it brought vaudeville, minstrel shows, illustrated songs, dramatic performances and even community pageants and plays to the Southern Maine community.

The introduction of talkies in 1928 began the transition from opera house to movie theater. In 1955, “improvements” to its interior were made, including panelling of the lobby and its staircase and addition poster displays and a cinemascope screen. The name of the opera house was at this time officially changed to Biddeford's City Theater.

However, with the increased popularity of drive-ins and television, City Theater had closed its doors by 1963 and remained closed until 1978. In the interim, Biddeford's City Theater was used as a storage facility for the city and, at one point, a horse-shoe pit, complete with a pile of sand dumped in the orchestra pit. Ironically, also during this period, in 1973 Biddeford's City Theater was added to the National Register of Historical Places.

In 1977, the newly incorporated City Theater Associates launched a campaign to renovate and re-open the opera house. Thus, a year later, the internationally popular Norman Luboff Choir opened for Biddeford's City Theater's first performance season in nearly 50 years.

Though great improvements were made to its interior during the re-opening, City Theater was still in great need of restoration. It was not until the 1990s, when City Theater celebrated its centennial, that the theater received a full restoration. Funding was provided by local, state and federal governments along with private donations from local businesses and individuals. A new marquee, re-stenciling of the lobby and house walls and ceilings and new sound and lighting were among the improvements made.

Present day

Current renovations to Biddeford's City Theater include re-pointing the exterior brickwork and improving the stage floor and restrooms.

City Theater currently runs a year-round season of theater, music and dance performances. Additionally, the theater has recently added community theater and youth opera and developed an ongoing relationship with the University of New England.

See also

National Register of Historic Places listings in York County, Maine

References

External links
 City of Biddeford, Maine
 Biddeford at Maine.gov
 McArthur Public Library
 University of New England
 Biddeford History & Heritage Project
 Biddeford’s City Theater on Facebook
  Video of Blood Brothers at Biddeford’s City Theater

Music venues completed in 1860
Theatres on the National Register of Historic Places in Maine
Buildings and structures in Biddeford, Maine
Opera houses in Maine
Tourist attractions in York County, Maine
Theatres completed in 1860
Government buildings completed in 1895
National Register of Historic Places in York County, Maine
Historic district contributing properties in Maine
Opera houses on the National Register of Historic Places
Event venues on the National Register of Historic Places in Maine